William Tynbegh, or de Thinbegh (c.1370-1424) was an Irish lawyer who had a long and distinguished career as a judge, holding office as Chief Justice of all three of the courts of common law and as Lord High Treasurer of Ireland. His career is unusual in that he left the Bench to become Attorney General for Ireland, but later returned to judicial office.

He was born in Ireland to a family of Welsh origin: his surname derives from the town of Tenby in Pembrokeshire. The Nicholas Tynbegh to whom the Crown directed him to convey lands in County Meath in 1414 was presumably a family member. In 1391 he received a license to study law in England. Somewhat surprisingly (since he can only have been called to the Bar a few years previously) he was appointed Lord Chief Justice of the King's Bench for Ireland as early as 1396 and Chief Baron of the Irish Exchequer in 1397. In 1400, in an act seemingly without precedent, he resigned from the Bench to become Attorney General. He is mentioned again as Chief Baron in 1405, when he apparently received a fresh patent of appointment. In 1409, and again in 1412, he received a royal commission to act as justice of the peace in Dublin and the adjoining counties. In 1409 he sat on a three-man commission to inquire into the export of foodstuffs from Ireland without royal licence; he was then acting as Deputy Lord Treasurer. In the same year he was one of five judges who heard a case of novel disseisin against the High Sheriff of Meath. He was Seneschal of County Wexford about 1413. He returned to the Court of Exchequer for a third term as Chief Baron in 1415, and was transferred to the Court of Common Pleas (Ireland) as Chief Justice in 1419. He apparently stepped down from the latter office, but was reappointed in 1424, not long before his death. A royal writ dated 1424 refers to his appointment in the previous January, and orders that he be paid his arrears of salary.  

In 1421 he persuaded the Crown to pardon Ralph Drake of Athboy, who had been declared an outlaw, not because of any notorious crime, but as a fairly common legal device in civil proceedings against a debtor. In the same year he sat on a commission with Reginald de Snyterby to try cases of treason in County Dublin.

In 1419 he was given custody of the lands at Stillorgan held by Robert Derpatrick, recently deceased, during the minority of Robert's brother and heir Stephen. He obtained a further grant on Stephen's death. He apparently experienced some difficulty in establishing control of Derpatrick, as in 1423 he felt obliged to remind the Crown of the grant.

In 1420 he witnessed the charter by which King Henry V guaranteed certain liberties and privileges to the Mayor and citizens of Dublin.

In the early stages of the Talbot-Butler feud, the clash between two powerful magnate families which dominated Irish public life for decades, Tynbegh was a member of the Talbot faction, headed by John Talbot, 1st Earl of Shrewsbury, and thus an opponent of James Butler, 4th Earl of Ormonde. He was seen very much as a Talbot "client", and owed his career advancement in its later stages to the fact. Ormonde as a result managed to have Tynbegh dismissed from the Bench, but after Tynbegh's return to office in his last years, they were able to work together amicably.

He spent some time in France in 1420-21. He was appointed Treasurer of Ireland in 1421, having regularly served as Deputy Treasurer. He was still living in March 1424, when he ordered the Archbishop of Dublin to make a grant of the lands formerly owned by Thomas Leger to Richard Vale; but he died later the same year.

References

1424 deaths
15th-century Irish judges
Irish people of Welsh descent
Year of birth unknown
Lords chief justice of Ireland
Chief Barons of the Irish Exchequer
Chief Justices of the Irish Common Pleas
Year of birth uncertain